The Roxy was a British music television programme broadcast on the ITV network from June 1987 to April 1988 and was produced by Tyne Tees Television in Newcastle, shortly after its more successful Channel 4 music show, The Tube, was decommissioned.

The show was initially presented by David Jensen and Kevin Sharkey. The first edition was transmitted across the ITV network on Tuesday 9 June 1987, introducing Erasure performing "Victim of Love". Subtitled as The Network Chart Show, The Roxy was based on the weekly chart compiled for Independent Local Radio which was broadcast on Sunday afternoons across ILR stations every Sunday afternoon from 5pm, in competition with BBC Radio 1's own chart show.

In January 1988 the programme was retitled Roxy The Network Chart Show along with a new studio set which included a large multicoloured sign spelling ROXY (This fell over at the end of the final edition using a flashpot effect & slow motion video & using the song "Leader of the Pack" by The Shangri-Las which played after the sign fell over).

The programme suffered from not having a fixed network timeslot and for a short time, an industrial dispute which affected live studio performances. After just ten months on air, The Roxy aired its final edition on Tuesday 5 April 1988. By this point, some regional stations aired the programme around midnight like Anglia, TVS and Thames while Grampian, Scottish, and Yorkshire opted out entirely.

The demise of The Roxy also signalled the end of major live music TV production at Tyne Tees, which asides The Tube, had also spanned series such as Alright Now, Razzmatazz and Check it Out. The company also produced coverage of Queen's concerts at Wembley and the Milton Keynes Bowl and co-produced U2 Live at Red Rocks: Under a Blood Red Sky.

References

1980s British music television series
1987 British television series debuts
1988 British television series endings
English-language television shows
Pop music television series
Television shows produced by Tyne Tees Television
Television series by ITV Studios